Giuseppe Maria Rolli or Roli (1645 – 17 November 1727) is an Italian painter and engraver active during the Baroque period, mainly in his native Bologna.

Biography
He was sent by his father to work along with Giuseppe Antonio Caccioli and later under Domenico Maria Canuti. He worked alongside his brother Antonio (1643-1695), who painted the quadratura.

Together the brothers painted for the Casa Ranuzzi in Bologna, Casa Miti in Imola, at the Camaldolese church of  Monte d'Alvernia,  at the church of the Scalzi and the Refectory of the Canons Lateranensi in Bologna, and at the cupoletta of San Lionardo in Bologna. By himself, Giuseppe painted the ceiling of the church of the Barnabites, the Oratory of San Giovanni Battista dei Fiorentini (1699), and the cupola of San Bartolomeo. He was recruited by the Prince of Baden to paint mythologic themes in frescoes. He gained a large inheritance and stopped painting, but then lost his fortune in later years.

References

1645 births
1727 deaths
17th-century Italian painters
18th-century Italian painters
Italian male painters
Painters from Bologna
Italian Baroque painters
18th-century Italian male artists